Kavan may refer to:
Kavan, Iran, a village in Ardabil Province, Iran
Anna Kavan, an English novelist 
Jan Kavan
František Kaván
 Kavan (film), a 2017 Tamil film